Wave motion gun is a fictional superweapon from the Space Battleship Yamato anime series

Wave motion gun may also refer to:

"Wave Motion Gun", a song by Marcy Playground from their 1999 album Shapeshifter
Wave-Motion gun, a weapon of fictional comic character Looter